Acetylgalactosaminyl-O-glycosyl-glycoprotein beta-1,3-N-acetylglucosaminyltransferase (O-glycosyl-oligosaccharide-glycoprotein N-acetylglucosaminyltransferase III, uridine diphosphoacetylglucosamine-mucin beta(1->3)-acetylglucosaminyltransferase, mucin core 3 beta3-GlcNAc-transferase, Core 3beta-GlcNAc-transferase, UDP-N-acetyl-D-glucosamine:O-glycosyl-glycoprotein (N-acetyl-D-glucosamine to N-acetyl-D-galactosaminyl-R) beta-1,3-N-acetyl-D-glucosaminyltransferase) is an enzyme with systematic name UDP-N-acetyl-D-glucosamine:N-acetyl-beta-D-galactosaminyl-R 3-beta-N-acetyl-D-glucosaminyltransferase. This enzyme catalyses the following chemical reaction

 UDP-N-acetyl-D-glucosamine + N-acetyl-beta-D-galactosaminyl-R  UDP + N-acetyl-beta-D-glucosaminyl-(1->3)-N-acetyl-beta-D-galactosaminyl-R

See also 
 EC 2.4.1.102 (beta-1,3-galactosyl-O-glycosyl-glycoprotein beta-1,6-N-acetylglucosaminyltransferase)
 EC 2.4.1.146 (beta-1,3-galactosyl-O-glycosyl-glycoprotein beta-1,3-N-acetylglucosaminyltransferase)
 EC 2.4.1.148 (acetylgalactosaminyl-O-glycosyl-glycoprotein beta-1,6-N-acetylglucosaminyltransferase).

References

External links 
 

EC 2.4.1